The giant damselfish (Microspathodon dorsalis) inhabit rocky reefs, below the surf zone at depths of 1–25 m. They feed mainly on low-profile, attached algae. They defend both feeding and reproductive territories by driving off other fishes and divers who come too close. They are oviparous, and form distinct pairings during breeding. The eggs are demersal and adhere to the substrate. Males guard and aerate the eggs.

Distribution
Eastern Pacific: central Gulf of California to Malpelo Island (Colombia), including the Revillagigedo, Cocos Island and the Galápagos Islands.

References

External links
 

giant damselfish
Fish of Mexican Pacific coast
Western Central American coastal fauna
Galápagos Islands coastal fauna
giant damselfish